Hawker Airfield (ICAO:YHAW) is a regional airport located at Hawker, South Australia.

Information 
The airstrip services the greater Flinders Ranges area up North in South Australia. The airstrip has only 1 runway (18/36) which is made from Asphalt. The airfield services the RFDS services, with a close proximity to the Flinders Rangers Way.

There is a small parking area for small aircraft. There is also a small service area, with toilets and water. There is no Avgas.

References

Airports in South Australia
Far North (South Australia)